William Shuckburgh Swayne (1862–1941) was a Church of England bishop and author who served as Dean of Manchester then Bishop of Lincoln in the first half of the 20th century.

Born in 1862 he was educated at New College, Oxford  and  ordained in 1886. He began his ecclesiastical career with curacies at Lyndhurst and Stalbridge and was then Diocesan Lecturer for Lichfield. After this he held incumbencies at St Matthew's Church, Walsall and then St Peter's, Cranley Gardens, a post he held until his consecration to the episcopate. He died on 30 June 1941.

References

Further reading

1862 births
1941 deaths
Alumni of New College, Oxford
Bishops of Lincoln
Deans of Manchester